Connor William Jessup (born June 23, 1994) is a Canadian actor, writer, and director. He is known for his roles as Ben Mason on the TNT science fiction television series Falling Skies (2011–2015), Taylor Blaine and Coy Henson in the ABC anthology series American Crime (2016–2017), and Tyler Locke in the Netflix series Locke & Key (2020–2022). He has also starred in feature films, most notably in the award-winning Blackbird (2012) and Closet Monster (2015).

Career

Acting
Jessup began acting at the age of 11 as a child actor. After various early jobs, including a role in a stage adaptation of The Full Monty, Jessup got a lead role in the children's television series The Saddle Club, for which he is also credited with conceptualizing the plot of one episode. He served as executive producer for the independent film Amy George, which played at the 2011 Toronto International Film Festival.

In 2011, Jessup was cast as a main character in the TNT science fiction series Falling Skies. He starred on the show for five seasons.

In 2012, Jessup starred in the Canadian independent film Blackbird, in which he played a troubled teen falsely accused of planning a school shooting. Jessup's performance received positive reviews and the film won various awards, including the Best Canadian First Feature Film award at the 2012 Toronto International Film Festival. The film won three awards at the Atlantic Film Festival and won the Vancouver International Film Festival award for Best Canadian Feature Film. It also screened at the Cannes Film Festival.

In 2015, Jessup also starred in the feature film Closet Monster, which won the Best Canadian Film Award at the 2015 Toronto International Film Festival, and screened at various film festivals around the world, before subsequently being released nationwide in July 2016.

In 2016, Jessup starred in the Emmy-winning ABC series American Crime as Taylor Blaine. His performance was praised by critics. He returned for the third season as Coy Henson.

In 2018, Jessup was cast as Tyler Locke, one of the main roles in the Netflix series Locke & Key, an adaptation of Joe Hill and Gabriel Rodriguez's popular comic series of the same name.

Filmmaking
Jessup has stated in numerous interviews that his intention is to work in the film industry beyond acting, as a director and filmmaker. In an interview with the  Toronto Star, Jessup said that directing "is where my mind and heart [are] at the moment". In 2014, Jessup starred in the short film Fragments, and in 2015, Jessup's short film Boy, which he wrote and directed, and was funded by bravoFACT, premiered at the 2015 Toronto International Film Festival.

In 2016, Jessup was included in Filmmaker Magazines annual list of the 25 New Faces of Independent Film. His short film Lira's Forest, which he wrote and directed, premiered at the 2017 Toronto International Film Festival. Jessup wants to expand this story with a feature film, Simon's Forest.

In 2017, it was announced that Jessup would be directing a documentary profile of Thai filmmaker Apichatpong Weerasethakul for FilmStruck and The Criterion Collection. The film was released in the spring of 2018.

In 2019, he produced the omnibus film 30/30 Vision: 3 Decades of Strand Releasing, which included short films by Ira Sachs, Catherine Breillat, Cindy Sherman, Athina Rachel Tsangari, Brady Corbet, Rithy Pahn, Lulu Wang and more. He contributed his own film to the program, Night Flight, inspired by the book by Antoine de Saint-Exupéry.

Influences
As a director, Jessup has expressed a particular fascination with Japanese film and culture and has stated in interviews that he is highly influenced by East Asian cinema, including directors Hirokazu Kore-eda, Edward Yang, Yasujirō Ozu, Hayao Miyazaki, Isao Takahata, and Apichatpong Weerasethakul. He has also expressed admiration for directors Abbas Kiarostami, Andrew Haigh, and Ira Sachs.

Personal life
Jessup is gay and came out publicly in a post on Instagram in June 2019.

Filmography

Film

Television

References

External links

1994 births
Living people
Film directors from Toronto
Male actors from Toronto
Canadian male child actors
Canadian male film actors
Writers from Toronto
Canadian gay actors
Canadian gay writers
Canadian male television actors
Canadian LGBT screenwriters
21st-century Canadian screenwriters
LGBT film directors
21st-century Canadian LGBT people
Gay screenwriters